Achaeus of Eretria (born 484 BC in Euboea) was a Greek playwright author of tragedies and satyr plays, variously said to have written 24, 30, or 44 plays, of which 19 titles are known: Adrastus, Aethon, Alcmeon, Alphesiboea, Athla, Azanes, Cycnus, Eumenides, Hephaestus, Iris, Linus, Moirai (Fates), Momus, Oedipus, Omphale, Philoctetes, Phrixus, Pirithous, and Theseus.  
Achaeus of Eretria was regarded in antiquity as being the 2nd greatest writer of satyr plays, after Aeschylus.

Achaeus' first play was produced in 447 and won a prize. A quote in Aristophanes' The Frogs suggests he was dead by 405. Some classicists suggest that the fact that he only won a single prize was due to his non-Athenian birth, as the men of Athens were loath to honor any but their own fellow-citizens.

Achaeus of Eretria belongs to the classic age, but is not recognized as a classic writer. His satyric plays were much admired for their spirited style, albeit somewhat labored and lacking in clarity. The philosopher Menedemus thought his plays second only to Aeschylus, he was part of the Alexandrian canon, and Didymus wrote a commentary on him. Athenaeus (10.451c) describes him as having a lucid style, but with tendencies to obscurity.  Athenaeus also claimed that Euripides took a line from Achaeus, while Aristophanes quotes him twice, in The Frogs and The Wasps.

His work survives only in fragments.

Notes

22nd greatest

References
 "Achaios (2)" from the Suda

Sources

484 BC births
5th-century BC deaths
Ancient Eretrians
Ancient Greek dramatists and playwrights
5th-century BC Greek people
5th-century BC writers
Ancient Greek poets
Tragic poets